Girls of the Golden West is an opera in two acts with music by  John Adams and a libretto by Peter Sellars. The San Francisco Opera commissioned the work jointly with Dallas Opera, the Dutch National Opera (De Nationale Opera) and Teatro La Fenice in Venice. The opera was premiered in San Francisco on November 21, 2017.  The running time is 160 minutes.

Composition history
The opera is inspired by the 1851/1852 letters of Louise Clappe, who lived for a year and a half in the mining settlement of Rich Bar (now Diamondville, California) during the California Gold Rush. Clappe published the letters under the pen name Dame Shirley. The libretto is also sourced from other literature of the period, including newspaper articles and the writings of Mark Twain. Adams wrote, "To be able to set to music the authentic voices of these people, whether from their letters or their songs or from newspaper accounts from their time, is a great privilege for me." Sellars, who also directed the opera, conceived the libretto while doing research for a production of Giacomo Puccini's 1910 opera La fanciulla del West (based on David Belasco's 1905 play The Girl of the Golden West), which also deals with the gold rush period. According to Sellars, "These true stories of the Forty-Niners are overwhelming in their heroism, passion and cruelty, telling tales of racial conflicts, colorful and humorous exploits, political strife and struggles to build anew a life and to decide what it would mean to be American."

Sellars's previous collaborations with Adams have included premiere productions of Nixon in China, The Death of Klinghoffer and Doctor Atomic (for which Sellars also wrote the libretto).

Roles

Recording
In January 2023 two live performances of the opera, performed at Walt Disney Concert Hall and conducted by the composer were recorded for Nonesuch Records, and will be released later in the year.

References

External links
Work details, including scoring, synopsis; "John Adams introduces Girls of the Golden West", interview, Boosey & Hawkes
 The Gutenberg Project scanned page images from "The Shirley Letters from California Mines in 1851-52" published in 1922 by Thomas C. Russell 

2017 operas
Operas by John Adams (composer)
Operas set in the United States
Operas set in the 19th century
Opera world premieres at San Francisco Opera
Operas based on literature
Operas
California Gold Rush in fiction